Arun Kumar Choudhury (January 6, 1923 - September 6, 1987) was the founding head of the Department of Computer Science and Engineering at the University of Calcutta. He was a pioneer in both Analog and Digital Computing, since 1950's.  A.K. Choudhury Memorial Lectures are arranged at various Indian Universities to celebrate his contributions.

Career

Choudhury was instrumental in building the first analog computer in India. He is best known for his work on optimization of Switching Circuits, High Threshold Logic, unate-cascade realizability and fault-tolerant synthesis of sequential machine

A list of Choudhury's publications may be found here and here.

Each year, lectures on Computer Science are arranged in memory of Choudhury's achievements. The Information Technology College at Calcutta University is named after Choudhury.

References

1923 births
1987 deaths
Academic staff of the University of Calcutta
University of Calcutta alumni
20th-century Indian physicists
Computer science articles needing expert attention
Physics articles needing expert attention
People from West Bengal